Diede Lemey (born 7 October 1996) is a Belgian footballer who plays as a goalkeeper for Fortuna Sittard in the Dutch Eredivisie.

Club career
Lemey played youth football at Ingelmunster and FC Meulebeke. In 2009, at the age of 13,  she went to VK Dames Egem. In 2012, she signed with RSC Anderlecht.

In 2022, she was awarded "Goalkeeper of the year" in the Italian Serie A, after a series of excellent performances for her team Sassuolo. Lemey managed nine clean sheets and a save rate of 74.2% that season.

International career
Lemey played for several Belgium youth teams, including the U15, U17 and U19 sides. On 22 November 2014, Lemey was called for the first time for the senior team. However, it was only on 19 January 2017 that she really played for her country in a match against France. Lemey was part of the group that represented Belgium at the 2017 Cyprus Women's Cup, she also part of the 23-women squad who went to the UEFA Women's Euro 2017. She was part of the national team at UEFA Women's Euro 2022.

Private life 
Lemey lives in a same-sex relationship with Belgian footballer Ella Van Kerkhoven.

References

Notes

External links
 
 
 

1996 births
Living people
People from Tielt
Footballers from West Flanders
Belgian women's footballers
Women's association football goalkeepers
Belgium women's international footballers
Belgium women's youth international footballers
UEFA Women's Euro 2022 players
Atalanta Mozzanica Calcio Femminile Dilettantistico players
Serie A (women's football) players
U.S. Sassuolo Calcio (women) players
Belgian expatriate footballers
Belgian expatriate sportspeople in Italy
Expatriate women's footballers in Italy
Belgium LGBT sportspeople
Belgian lesbians
LGBT association football players
Lesbian sportswomen
21st-century Belgian LGBT people
UEFA Women's Euro 2017 players
Fortuna Sittard (women) players
Eredivisie (women) players